The Sheep Pass Formation is a geologic formation in Nevada. It preserves fossils dating back to the Paleogene period.

Fossil content

Vertebrates

Invertebrates

See also

 List of fossiliferous stratigraphic units in Nevada
 Nevadaplano
 Paleontology in Nevada

References

 

Paleogene geology of Nevada